Kerala Kesari is a 1951 Indian Malayalam-language film, directed by V. Krishnan and produced by Vaikkam Vasudevan Nair. The film stars K. K. Aroor and Durga Varma in lead roles. The film had musical score by Jnanamani.

Cast
 K. K. Aroor
 Durga Varma
 Thankam Vasudevan Nair
 K. S. Parvathy
 Paravoor Bharathan
 Vaikkam Vasudevan Nair
 Kalaikkal Kumaran

References

External links
 

1951 films
1950s Malayalam-language films